Çəmənli is a village and municipality in the Agdam District of Azerbaijan. It has a population of 2,207. The municipality consists of the villages of Çəmənli and Şükürağalı.

References 

Populated places in Aghdam District